AACN Advanced Critical Care is a peer-reviewed nursing journal and an official publication of the American Association of Critical Care Nurses. It is intended for "experienced critical care and acute care clinicians at the bedside, advanced practice nurses, and clinical and academic educators."

It is the merger of AACN Clinical Issues: Advanced Practice in Acute and Critical Care (1990–2006), and AACN Clinical Issues (1994–2006) formerly known as AACN Clinical Issues in Critical Care Nursing (1990–1994).

Indexing and abstracting 
The journal is indexed and abstracted in: Academic Search, CINAHL, PubMed, and Scopus.

See also
AACN Nursing Scan in Critical Care
List of nursing journals

References

External links 
 

Publications established in 1990
English-language journals
Ambulatory care nursing journals
Critical care nursing journals
Lippincott Williams & Wilkins academic journals
Quarterly journals